Gustavo Fabrice Sangaré (born 8 November 1996) is a Burkinabé professional footballer who plays as a midfielder for Ligue 2 club Quevilly-Rouen and the Burkina Faso national team.

Club career
A youth product of Salitas and Frontignan, Sangaré joined the reserve side Quevilly-Rouen in 2018. In 2019, he was promoted to their first team in the Championnat National.

International career
Sangaré Sangaré received his first callup to the senior Burkina Faso national team in May 2021. He debuted with Burkina Faso in a 1–0 friendly loss to Morocco on 12 June 2021. Gustavo Sangaré featured in the 2021 AFCON third place match against Cameroon.

Career statistics

Scores and results list Burkina Faso's goal tally first, score column indicates score after each Sangaré goal.

References

External links

1996 births
Living people
People from Bobo-Dioulasso
Burkinabé footballers
Burkina Faso international footballers
US Quevilly-Rouen Métropole players
Championnat National players
Championnat National 3 players
Ligue 2 players
Association football midfielders
Burkinabé expatriate footballers
Burkinabé expatriate sportspeople in France
Expatriate footballers in France
Salitas FC players
21st-century Burkinabé people
2021 Africa Cup of Nations players